Emory Brook flows into Bush Kill by Fleischmanns, New York.

References

Rivers of New York (state)
Rivers of Delaware County, New York
Tributaries of the East Branch Delaware River